Palos de la Frontera is a station on Line 3 of the Madrid Metro. It is located in fare Zone A.

References 

Line 3 (Madrid Metro) stations
Railway stations in Spain opened in 1949